Tüzün or Tuzun is a Turkish name. Notable people with the name include:

 Oğuzhan Tüzün (born 1982), Turkish sport shooter
 Serpil Hamdi Tüzün, Turkish football coach
 Sibel Tüzün (born 1971), Turkish female pop/rock/jazz singer
 Tuzun, Turkic general and Abbasid official

Turkish-language surnames